This is a list of swimming pools in Sweden.

Olympic sized pools

Other 50m pools

25m pools

Footnotes

Swimming pools
Swimming
Sweden